The ninth season of Chicago P.D., an American police drama television series with executive producer Dick Wolf, and producers Derek Haas, Michael Brandt, and Rick Eid was ordered on February 27, 2020, by NBC. The season premiered on September 22, 2021.

Cast

Regular cast members 

 Jason Beghe as Sergeant Henry "Hank" Voight
 Jesse Lee Soffer as Detective Jay Halstead
 Tracy Spiridakos as Detective Hailey Upton
 Marina Squerciati as Officer Kim Burgess
 Patrick John Flueger as Officer Adam Ruzek
 LaRoyce Hawkins as Officer Kevin Atwater
 Amy Morton as Desk Sergeant Trudy Platt

Recurring guest characters 
 Nicole Ari Parker as Deputy Superintendent Samantha Miller
 Ramona Edith Williams as Makayla Burgess
 Carmela Zumbado as Anna Avalos
 Alex Morf as FBI Special Agent Walker North
 Amanda Payton as Celeste Nichols

Crossover characters 
Guy Lockard as Dr. Dylan Scott

Episodes

Ratings

References

External links

2021 American television seasons
2022 American television seasons
Chicago P.D. (TV series) seasons